Gwendolyn Thomas Sorell (Aug. 1, 1936 -  March 23, 2009) was an American academic, rising to associate professor of human development and family studies at Texas Tech University.

Academic career

After a 1979 MSc thesis titled  'Adaptive implications of sex-related attitudes and behaviors,'   a 1982 PhD titled  'Masculinity and femininity in traditional and nontraditional adult women : a test of the parental imperative'  at the Pennsylvania State University, and a post-doc at University of Denver, Sorell moved to the University of Texas Tech, rising to associate professor.

The Gwen Sorell Endowed Scholarship is administered by the Women's & Gender Studies departement.

Activism 

Sorell served in governance roles in organisations such as the Lubbock Rape Crisis Center, the West Texas AIDS Foundation and the Planned Parenthood Association of Lubbock.

Selected works 
 Kiesling, Chris, Gwendolyn T. Sorell, Marilyn J. Montgomery, and Ronald K. Colwell. "Identity and spirituality: A psychosocial exploration of the sense of spiritual self." In Meeting of the Society for Research in Adult Development, Apr, 2003, Tampa, FL, US.
 Sorell, Gwendolyn T., and Marilyn J. Montgomery. "Feminist perspectives on Erikson's theory: Their relevance for contemporary identity development research." Identity: An International Journal of Theory and Research 1, no. 2 (2001): 97-128.
 Morrow, K. Brent, and Gwendolyn T. Sorell. "Factors affecting self-esteem, depression, and negative behaviors in sexually abused female adolescents." Journal of Marriage and the Family (1989): 677-686.
 Montgomery, Marilyn J., and Gwendolyn T. Sorell. "Love and dating experience in early and middle adolescence: Grade and gender comparisons." Journal of adolescence 21, no. 6 (1998): 677-689.
 Montgomery, Marilyn J., and Gwendolyn T. Sorell. "Differences in love attitudes across family life stages." Family Relations (1997): 55-61.
 Fischer, Judith L., Donna L. Sollie, Gwendolyn T. Sorell, and Shelley K. Green. "Marital status and career stage influences on social networks of young adults." Journal of Marriage and the Family (1989): 521-534.

References

Women's studies academics
1936 births
2009 deaths
Deaths from cancer in Illinois
Pennsylvania State University alumni
People from Lubbock, Texas
Texas Tech University faculty